Timissa is a small town and commune in the Cercle of Tominian in the Ségou Region of Mali. As of 1998 the commune had a population of 14,829.

References

Communes of Ségou Region